Otaqvar (also Romanized as Oţāqvar) is a city and capital of Otaqvar District, in Langarud County, Gilan Province, Iran.  At the 2006 census, its population was 1,404, in 418 families.

It connects to four cities in Gilan, Langarud, Lahijan, Rudsar and Amlash.  It is 16 km from the sea.

References

Populated places in Langarud County
Cities in Gilan Province